is a private Christian secondary school in , Kita, Tokyo. It is a part of the Seigakuin educational group.

References

External links
 Seigakuin Junior & Senior High School 
 English information

Private schools in Tokyo
Junior high schools in Japan
High schools in Tokyo
Boys' schools in Japan
Christian schools in Japan